Edward Wynne may refer to:

 Edward Wynne (colonial administrator), proprietary governor of the Ferryland colony from 1621 to 1626
 Edward Wynne (chancellor) (1681–1755), Welsh lawyer and landowner
 Edward Wynne (jurist) (1734–1784), English lawyer and scholar
 Ed Wynne (born 1961), English guitarist
 Ed Wynne (saxophonist), musician with the Doobie Brothers
 Edward Wynne-Pendarves (1775–1853), British politician

See also
 Ed Wynn (1886–1966), American actor and comedian
 Edward Wynn (1889–1956), English bishop
 William Watkin Edward Wynne (1801–1880), Welsh politician and antiquarian